The Asnières Castors is a French ice hockey team based in Asnières-sur-Seine playing in the FFHG Division 2.

The team currently use the name of "Castors d'Asnières".

History
The team was founded in 1972 and plays home games at the Patinoire olympique d'Asnières.

Players

Captains and Assistant Captains 
Captains and Assistant Captains' list

Players who played for Asnières Hockey Club 
In alphabetical order (who have a French Wikipedia page)

References

External links
 Official website 

Ice hockey teams in France